Matthew Yorke (born 24 November 1958) is a British novelist and editor.

Yorke is the son of novelist Emma Tennant and Sebastian Yorke, son of Henry Green.

His novels include:

The March Fence (Penguin, 1988), winner of the John Llewellyn Rhys Prize.

Chancing It (Waywiser Press, 2005), Book of the Year Nominations: The Scotsman, The Daily Telegraph, Times Literary Supplement.

Pictures of Lily (Corsair, 2010), shortlisted for Not the Booker Prize.

Fish Tale (Cogito, 2022).

He has also edited Surviving: The Uncollected Works of Henry Green (his grandfather, whose real name was Henry Yorke).

References

External links 
 Matthew Yorke at Waywiser Press
 Synopsis of Pictures of Lily at Constable & Robinson

1958 births
Living people
20th-century British novelists
21st-century British novelists
British male novelists
Tennant family
Matthew
20th-century British male writers
21st-century British male writers